Zhou Wei (born 1976 in Ganzhou, Jiangxi province) is a Chinese track and field athlete who competes in the sprints.

Zhou won a gold medal in 1998 Asian Athletics Championships over 100 metres and held the Chinese record in 100 m with his best of 10.17 seconds.

Doping
Zhou Wei tested positive for a prohibited substance on 7 June 2000, and was subsequently handed a two-year ban from sport.

References

1976 births
Living people
Doping cases in athletics
Chinese sportspeople in doping cases
Chinese male sprinters
People from Ganzhou
Runners from Jiangxi
Athletes (track and field) at the 1998 Asian Games
Asian Games competitors for China
20th-century Chinese people